Drug-induced purpura is a skin condition that may be related to platelet destruction, vessel fragility, interference with platelet function, or vasculitis.

See also 
 Food-induced purpura
 Rumpel-Leede sign
 Skin lesion

References 

Vascular-related cutaneous conditions
Drug-induced diseases